The Castle Douglas and Dumfries Railway was a railway in south west Scotland which linked Castle Douglas in Kirkcudbrightshire to Dumfries.

It opened in 1859. Other companies' lines extended westwards and southwards, and the CD&D line formed a key link in opening up the agricultural area of south-west Scotland. When Stranraer and Portpatrick were reached by the contiguous lines, the CD&D line was the eastern section of the Port Road, which provided an important route from English originating points to Northern Ireland by ferry between Portpatrick and Donaghadee. Much later the ferry route was from Stranraer to Larne.

The CD&DR was absorbed by the larger Glasgow and South Western Railway in 1865.

The line was one of the 1965 Beeching closures, except for a stub from Dumfries to Maxwelltown Oil Terminal which continued until 1994, although it was dormant in the latter years. Nothing now remains of the rail activity on the line.

History

Authorisation and construction
In the middle of the nineteenth century the counties of Galloway, Wigtownshire and Kirkcudbrightshire were devoted to agriculture, but lacked efficient land communications links with the rest of the United Kingdom. Mail from the northern part of England, and Scotland, to Ireland passed this way through the ports of Portpatrick and Donaghadee, but the poor roads made the passage difficult.

The Glasgow, Dumfries and Carlisle Railway (GD&CR) was authorised in 1846 and the authorisation appears to have included a branch from Dumfries to Kirkcudbright, but the shortage of money at that time led to abandonment of the plans for the branch.

The opening of the Chester and Holyhead Railway in 1850 induced the Post Office to transfer the mail to that route. In the same year the GD&CR merged with other lines to form the Glasgow and South Western Railway (G&SWR). The directors of the G&SWR sought to open up the area, with a view to regaining the mail traffic in due course. The G&SWR also wished to forestall any incursion into the area by the rival Caledonian Railway.

The G&SWR line passed through Dumfries on its route from Carlisle to Glasgow, and the Company had a line from Glasgow to Ayr. Both points were a considerable distance from Portpatrick, and when local interests promoted a railway connecting Castle Douglas to Dumfries, the G&SWR encouraged the scheme, seeing it as a first step in its plans. The G&SWR encouragement took tangible form in a subscription of £60,000, which was half of the proposed capital of the scheme. Local interests found the remainder, and a Bill was presented to Parliament; it attracted little opposition and the authorising Act for the Castle Douglas and Dumfries Railway was passed on 21 July 1856. The line was to be a little over 19 miles (31 km) long.

Construction proceeded quickly, but the authorised capital proved insufficient for completion, and an additional £24,000 in 6% preference shares was authorised by Parliament in the 1859 session; the G&SWR subscribed all of the additional capital, becoming the majority shareholder.

Opening
The line opened on 7 November 1859 and was immediately commercially successful; the preference share dividend was paid in full and sufficient surplus enabled a 1% dividend to be paid on ordinary shares in the first full year. The line was operated from the outset by the G&SWR.

In 1861 the Portpatrick Railway completed a connection from Castle Douglas to Stranraer and Portpatrick, and through traffic ran from Carlisle and points south and east over the CD&DR line.

The Castle Douglas and Dumfries Railway was amalgamated with the Glasgow and South Western Railway on 1 August 1865, by the terms of the G.&S.W.R. Amalgamation Act of 5 July 1865.

In the twentieth century the amalgamated G&SWR formed part of the London, Midland and Scottish Railway in the 1923 grouping of the railways.

The Caledonian Railway gained running powers over the line between Dumfries and Castle Douglas, which allowed it access to Portpatrick, Stranraer and Stranraer harbour over a jointly owned line, the Portpatrick and Wigtownshire Joint Railway. These running rights allowed the Caledonian Railway to run Irish boat trains from Carlisle and south of the border, considerably shortening the former longer route though Ayrshire.

Closure
The line was substantially closed, under the Beeching Axe, on 14 June 1965. The section between Maxwelltown and Dumfries remained open to serve an oil depot, but this section of line has now been lifted and is a cycleway/footpath.

Dalbeattie accident, 1874
There was a collision on the single line in 1874. In Tales of the Glasgow and South Western Railway, Smith records that

All west of Lochanhead was single line then. A G.&S.W. ballast train had the staff and was working in the section to Castle Douglas. A westbound Caledonian goods was given a ticket, and about a mile west of Dalbeattie met the ballast [train] returning. Three of the enginemen were killed. Of course, staff and ticket working was absolutely foolproof. The tickets were in a locked box, openable only by the key on the end of the staff. But then, nobody ever used the key on the end of the staff; the point of the standard office poker fitted the lock exactly.

Smith amplifies the detail in his The Little Railways of South-West Scotland:

The goods train was the 11:30 a.m. from Dumfries to Stranraer; Driver John Robb received a ticket at Lochanhead; asked if he had seen the staff "he could not remember clearly". At Kirkgunzeon he received a ticket again, and was not shown the staff. At Dalbeattie he went through the station slowly and William Douglas, a 16-year-old goods clerk, handed Robb a ticket; Robb said that he asked him, "Is that all right?" and Douglas replied, "Yes, go on."

Douglas later said that he knew nothing of the ballast train, but when the goods train arrived, he found the book of tickets lying open on the desk; he wrote out the ticket and gave it to Robb.

The ballast train was returning to Dalbeattie, running down a gradient of 1 in 100 with little forward visibility. The collision was inevitable; both engine drivers died.

Topography
The line left Dumfries station curving immediately westwards and south-westwards, through difficult terrain.

As built the line was single, but it was doubled throughout 

Stations were at
 Maxwelltown (closed 1 March 1939)
 Lochanhead (closed 25 September 1939)
 Killywhan (closed 3 August 1959)
 Kirkgunzeon (closed 2 January 1950)
 Southwick (closed 25 September 1939; reopened 3 February 1941; closed 3 May 1965)
 Dalbeattie (closed 14 June 1965)
 Buittle (closed 1 October 1894)
 Castle Douglas (closed 14 June 1965).

The line west of Maxwelltown Oil Terminal closed on 14 June 1965, and the Maxwelltown stub closed in 1994, having been dormant for several years.

Connections to other lines
 Glasgow, Dumfries and Carlisle Railway at Dumfries.
 The Dumfries, Lochmaben & Lockerbie Railway at Dumfries.
 Kirkcudbright Railway at Castle Douglas.
 Portpatrick Railway at Castle Douglas.

Notes

References

Sources 
 
 

Early Scottish railway companies
Glasgow and South Western Railway
Pre-grouping British railway companies
Railway lines in Scotland
Railway companies established in 1859
Railway lines opened in 1859
Railway companies disestablished in 1965
Standard gauge railways in Scotland
Borders of Scotland
Transport in Dumfries and Galloway
1859 establishments in Scotland
1965 disestablishments in Scotland
Closed railway lines in Scotland